Marc Andreu (born 27 December 1985 in Fréjus, Var) is a French rugby union player. Andreu, who is a wing, plays his club rugby for La Rochelle having previously been at Racing 92. He made his debut for France against Wales on 26 February  2010. He scored his first international try against Italy in a 2010 Six Nations Championship match on 14 March 2010.

International tries

Honours

Club 
 Castres
Top 14: 2012–13

 Racing 92
Top 14: 2015–16

References

External links

FFR profile 

1985 births
Living people
Sportspeople from Fréjus
French rugby union players
France international rugby union players
Rugby union wings
RC Toulonnais players
Stade Rochelais players